MV PFC James Anderson Jr. (AK-3002), (former MV Emma Mærsk), was the third ship of the  built in 1979. The ship is named after Private First Class James Anderson Jr., an American Marine who was awarded the Medal of Honor during the Vietnam War.

Construction and commissioning 
The ship was built in 1979 at the Odense Staalskibsvaerft A/S, Lindø, Denmark. She was put into the service of Maersk Line as Emma Mærsk.

In 1983, she was acquired and chartered by the Navy under a long-term contract as MV PFC James. Anderson Jr. (AK-3002). The ship underwent conversion at the Bethlehem Steel at Sparrows Point, Massachusetts. She was assigned to Maritime Prepositioning Ship Squadron 3 and supported the US Marine Corps Expeditionary Brigade.

On 21 September 1990, she unloaded military cargos in support of Operation Desert Storm.

In 2009, the ship was struck from the Naval Register and later in August she was sold for scrap.

Awards 

 National Defense Service Medal

References

Cpl. Louis J. Hauge Jr.-class cargo ship
1979 ships
Ships built in Denmark
Gulf War ships of the United States
Merchant ships of the United States
Cargo ships of the United States Navy
Container ships of the United States Navy